Leucoperina is a genus of moths in the subfamily Lymantriinae. The genus was erected by Per Olof Christopher Aurivillius in 1909.

Species
Leucoperina atroguttata Aurivillius, 1909
Leucoperina kahli Holland, 1920

References

Lymantriinae